Latheticus oryzae (common name long headed flour beetle) is a species of beetle.

Description 
This beetle is light brown in color with elongated body measuring 2-3 mm. It resembles Tribolium casteneum..

Diet 
Both adult and grub feed on a milled product and can exist as a secondary infestation in stored grains. It attacks cereals, flour, packaged food, rice and rice products.

Reproduction 
The female lays 400 white eggs on grains.

References

Tenebrionidae